David Alan LaCerte (born November 6, 1979) was the Secretary of the Louisiana Department of Veterans Affairs (LDVA) in the administration of Governor Bobby Jindal. He had been the Interim Secretary from January 2013 to September 2013.

He served as an appointee of President Donald Trump as a senior advisor at the U.S. Office of Personnel Management. 

In January 2021, he was appointed as a Senior Advisor and Executive Counsel at the U.S. Chemical Safety and Hazard Investigation Board and served as Acting Managing Director. He still holds the position of Senior Advisor/Executive Counsel as of September 2022.

Military career
LaCerte served in the United States Marine Corps Infantry at 1st Battalion 1st Marines (1/1). Shortly after the September 11 attacks in 2001, he was deployed to Afghanistan under the command of General James Mattis. LaCerte led over 100 combat patrols and missions in Afghanistan and Pakistan and served on interrogation teams for high value Al Qaeda targets.

Louisiana Department of Veterans Affairs 
LaCerte is a graduate of Nicholls State University and Paul M. Hebert Law Center. He joined the LDVA in 2010 as Deputy Secretary and Executive Counsel under Secretary Lane Carson. Following the retirement of Carson, LaCerte served as the Interim Secretary of LDVA until the appointment of former US Representative Rodney Alexander in September 2013. LaCerte was appointed by Governor Bobby Jindal as Secretary after Alexander resigned on June 3, 2014.

Under the leadership of Secretary LaCerte, LDVA experienced a historic period of financial reforms, becoming the first state to transition completely from state appropriations in the Veteran Homes program, expanding Parish Service Offices to every parish in the state and doubling Louisiana's VA Disability Payments to over $1 billion, and building three additional state veterans' cemeteries at Fort Polk, Slidell, and Rayville.

LaCerte was the first chairman of the Louisiana Military Advisory Council, tasked with reinforcing the state's military footprint in the face of potentially devastating cuts of thousands of soldiers and family members at Fort Polk. Due to the efforts of the LMAC and LaCerte as chairman, Fort Polk escaped major cuts which would have been catastrophic to the local and state economies.

LDVA also sponsored and passed legislation in many areas, including benefits reform, military spouse occupational license reciprocity, and some of the early Veterans Treatment Courts in the nation.

LaCerte resigned in October 2015 amid two investigations into his office, prompted by a report, released in August 2015, that turned up concerns about conditions and lack of oversight at nursing homes for veterans. The investigations by the Louisiana legislative auditor and the State Inspector General's Office found possible misspending of funds and failure to report alleged violence against a veteran.

LaCerte famously called the report "garbage" and sued the state, the legislative auditor, and the Inspector General for defamation.

Office of Personnel Management 
In June 2020, LaCerte left the private practice of law as a partner at the Louisiana law firm of Sternberg Naccari and White and was appointed by the White House as a senior advisor at the Office of Personnel Management where he served in policy and as a special counsel in the administration of the President.

References

1979 births
Living people
American lawyers
United States Marine Corps personnel of the War in Afghanistan (2001–2021)
Nicholls State University alumni
Louisiana State University Law Center alumni
State cabinet secretaries of Louisiana